Tarapore or Taraporevala (also Taraporewala) is an Indian (Parsi) toponymic surname from Tarapur, Maharashtra. Notable people with the surname include:

 Ardeshir Tarapore (1923–1965), Indian lieutenant colonel in the Indo-Pakistani War of 1965
 Farokh Tarapore  (born 1960), Indian sailor
 Keki Tarapore (1910–1986), Indian cricketer
 Keki Tarapore (coach) (1922–2001), Indian cricketer and coach
 Shavir Tarapore (born 1957), Indian cricket umpire
 S. S. Tarapore (1936-2016), deputy governor of the Reserve Bank of India, chairman of the Tarapore committee
 Sooni Taraporevala (born 1957), Indian screenwriter and filmmaker

See also 

 Taraporewala Aquarium, India's oldest aquarium in Mumbai

Toponymic surnames
Indian surnames
Gujarati-language surnames
People from Palghar district
Parsi people